Faisalabad Arts Council (FAC) is an arts center in Faisalabad, Pakistan. It was established in 1982 by the Government of Punjab, now working under the 'Punjab Arts Council'. It was designed by Nayyar Ali Dada and its current building was completed in 2006. Its chairman is the Commissioner of Faisalabad Division. Tariq Javaid is the resident director of arts council.

References 

New Name of Faisalabad Arts Council.....
Punjab Arts Council Faisalabad

External links 

 
 

1982 establishments in Pakistan
Arts centres in Pakistan
Art museums and galleries in Pakistan
Organisations based in Faisalabad
Theatres in Pakistan
Culture in Faisalabad
Nayyar Ali Dada buildings and structures
Arts organisations based in Pakistan